DeKalb county Airport  is a public airport  south of Auburn, in DeKalb County, Indiana. The airport was founded in October 1964 to replace the old Auburn Airport.

References

External links 

Airports in Indiana
Transportation buildings and structures in DeKalb County, Indiana